Port Wing (also Portwing) is an unincorporated census-designated place in the town of Port Wing, Bayfield County, Wisconsin, United States. The Flag River enters Lake Superior at Port Wing's harbor.

Population
As of the 2010 census, its population is 164.

Education
Port Wing is the site of South Shore School District.

Notable people
 Jolene Anderson, former WNBA player, Big Ten Conference Women's Basketball Player of the Year in 2007-08 and the all-time leading scorer for the University of Wisconsin women's basketball team, grew up in Port Wing.
 Megan Gustafson, 2019 Naismith Award winner and two-time Big Ten Conference Women's Basketball Player of the Year at the University of Iowa, was raised from infancy in Port Wing (though born in a Duluth, Minnesota hospital).
Gary Sherman, politician and jurist, lived in Port Wing.

Notes

External links
Port Wing Area Business Association

Census-designated places in Bayfield County, Wisconsin
Census-designated places in Wisconsin